McCoy Lake is a lake  3.8 miles from Port Alberni.

Fishing
There are a variety of fish including bull trout, striped bass and chinook salmon.

See also
List of lakes of British Columbia

References

Alberni Valley
Lakes of Vancouver Island
Alberni Land District